Pilsbryspira elozantha is a species of sea snail, a marine gastropod mollusk in the family Pseudomelatomidae, the turrids and allies.

Description

Distribution
This species occurs off the South Carolina, USA.

References

 Ravenel, Edmund: "Description of new Recent shells from the coast of South Carolina." Proceedings of the Academy of Natural Sciences of Philadelphia 4144 (1861).

External links
 
 Gastropods.com: Pilsbryspira elozantha

elozantha
Gastropods described in 1861